The 1916 United States presidential election in New York took place on November 7, 1916. All contemporary 48 states were part of the 1916 United States presidential election. Voters chose 45 electors to the Electoral College, which selected the president and vice president.

New York was won by the Republican nominee, U.S. Supreme Court Justice Charles Evans Hughes of New York, and his running mate Indiana Senator Charles W. Fairbanks. Hughes and Fairbanks defeated the Democratic nominees, incumbent Democratic President Woodrow Wilson and Vice President Thomas R. Marshall.

A former Governor of New York, Hughes won his home state fairly comfortably, taking 51.53% of the vote to Wilson’s 44.51%, a victory margin of 7.02%. Coming in a distant third was Socialist candidate Allan L. Benson, who took 2.69%, mainly among Jewish Americans in New York City.

New York during the Fourth Party System was usually a Republican state in presidential elections; however in 1912, a strong third party run by former Republican President Theodore Roosevelt against the incumbent Republican President William Howard Taft had split the Republican vote, and had enabled Woodrow Wilson as the Democratic candidate to win New York State’s electoral votes in 1912 with a plurality of only 41%. With the Republicans re-united behind Charles Evans Hughes in 1916, and criticism of Wilson’s policies already emanating from the Democrats’ Irish-American base, New York returned to the Republican column, and delivered a fairly comfortable win to Hughes even as Wilson won re-election nationwide. Hughes’ 7% margin of victory made New York State a strong 10% more Republican than the national average in the 1916 election.

Nonetheless, this was the last occasion until 1964 that the Democratic Party carried Hamilton County, Schoharie County, Otsego County and Chemung County. With the exception of Chemung, these were historically German or Dutch and usually Democratic rural counties that would turn permanently to the GOP amidst the fallout from World War I.

Hughes' victory in the state made him the second Republican presidential candidate to win New York without winning the election, the first was John C. Frémont in 1856 and the third was Thomas E. Dewey in 1948. Hughes also became the first losing candidate to win the state since Samuel J. Tilden in 1876.

Results

Results by county

See also
 United States presidential elections in New York
 Presidency of Woodrow Wilson

References

New York
1916
1916 New York (state) elections